Payal Ki Jhankaar is a 1980 Indian romance film directed by Satyen Bose. The film was selected as the Indian entry for the Best Foreign Language Film at the 53rd Academy Awards, but was not accepted as a nominee.

Cast
 Alankar Joshi as Gopal Bhatt
 Rupini as Shyama
 Surinder Kaur as Veena
 Veena
 Bandini as Naini
 Shail Chaturvedi as Dinanath
 C. S. Dubey as Shivram - Shyama's uncle
 Sudha Shivpuri as Bhavani - Shyama's aunt

Music
"Kaun Gali Gaye Shyam" - Sulakshana Pandit
"Bin Gopal" - K. J. Yesudas
"Dekho Kanha Nahin" - Sulakshana Pandit, K. J. Yesudas, Hariharan
"Ho Rama Pani Bharne" - Anand Kumar, Sulakshana Pandit
"Thirkat Ang Lachki Jhuki" - Alka Yagnik (It is the first/debut song of Alka Yagnik)
"Sari Dal Dai Mope Rang" - Purushottam Das Jalota, Sulakshana Pandit
"Jhirmir Jhirmir Sawan Aaye" - Anand Kumar, Sulakshana Pandit
"Jai Maa Ganga" - Chandrani Mukherjee
"Jin Khoja Tin Paiyan" - Jaspal Singh
"Kar Singaar Aise" - Aarti Mukherjee, Purushottam Jalota, Anand Kumar, Sulakshana Pandit
"Nanha Sa Phool" - Sulakshana Pandit
"Soor Bin Tan Nahin" - Sulakshana Pandit, Anand Kumar, Purushottam Jalota

See also
 List of submissions to the 53rd Academy Awards for Best Foreign Language Film
 List of Indian submissions for the Academy Award for Best Foreign Language Film

References

External links
 

1980 films
Films scored by Raj Kamal
1980s romance films
1980s Hindi-language films
Indian romance films
Films directed by Satyen Bose
Hindi-language romance films
Rajshri Productions films